Enrica Bonaccorti (born 18 November 1949) is an Italian former actress, television and radio presenter, and lyricist.

Life and career 
Born in Savona, Bonaccorti spent her adolescence in several cities, including Sassari and Genoa, because of the work of her father, a police colonel. She started her career on stage, debuting in the play Alla ringhiera and later joining the stage company held by Domenico Modugno and Paola Quattrini. She also collaborated with Modugno  composing the lyrics of several songs, notably Modugno's hits "" and "".  During the 1970s she also appeared in films and television series.  She debuted as radio presenter in 1974, with the program  she hosted alongside the poet Alfonso Gatto, and as television in 1978 with the quiz show , she co-hosted with Michele Gammino.  She had the peak of her career between the mid-1980s and the early 1990s, when she hosted the successful quiz shows  (1985–1987),  (1988–1991) and the first season of the variety show Non è la Rai (1991–1992). She is an atheist.

References

External links 

People from Savona
Italian stage actresses
Italian film actresses
Italian television actresses
1949 births
20th-century Italian actresses
Living people
Italian television presenters
Italian radio presenters
Italian lyricists
Italian women radio presenters
Italian women television presenters
Italian atheists